FC Surozh Sudak (Futbol′nyy klub Surozh Sudak) was an amateur football club from Sudak, Crimea.

Description and history
The club's name is an obsolete version of the city in the Ruthenian language. As a club, it existed until 2007. After its liquidation, the club's academy still delegates junior teams in Ukrainian youth competitions. Before FC Surozh participated in Ukrainian competitions of lower leagues and among amateurs. The club was champion of the Crimea Football Championship at least twice in 1992 and 1996/97.

In 1992–93 as the only representative from Crimea, Surozh participated in the Ukrainian competitions among KFK (fitness clubs) and earned a promotion to the Transitional League (later the Third League). During that season the club played its home games in a settlement Zolote Pole that is located further inland in the Kirovske Raion.

Its first game at a professional level, the club played on 31 August 1992 in Kiev against FC CSKA Kyiv (at that time CSK ZSU Kyiv). The first season at a professional level was not successful and the club was relegated to amateurs.

The 1994–95 season FC Surozh participated in the competition of KFK. After failing to obtain promotion, the club withdrew from national amateur competitions and concentrated on the regional competitions in Crimea.

League and cup history

Soviet Union
{|class="wikitable"
|-bgcolor="#efefef"
! Season
! Div.
! Pos.
! Pl.
! W
! D
! L
! GS
! GA
! P
!Domestic Cup
!colspan=2|Europe
!Notes
|- bgcolor=SteelBlue
|align=center|1991
|align=center|5th KFK Ukrainian SSR Gr. 4
|align=center|5/16
|align=center|30
|align=center|14
|align=center|11
|align=center|5
|align=center|65
|align=center|20
|align=center|39
|align=center|
|align=center|
|align=center|
|align=center bgcolor=brick|Reorganization of competitions
|}

Ukraine

{|class="wikitable"
|-bgcolor="#efefef"
! Season
! Div.
! Pos.
! Pl.
! W
! D
! L
! GS
! GA
! P
!Domestic Cup
!colspan=2|Europe
!Notes
|- bgcolor=SteelBlue
|align=center|1992–93
|align=center|5th Amateur League Gr. 6
|align=center bgcolor=gold|1/14
|align=center|26
|align=center|20
|align=center|4
|align=center|2
|align=center|56
|align=center|13
|align=center|44
|align=center|
|align=center|
|align=center|
|align=center bgcolor=lightgreen|Promoted
|- bgcolor=SteelBlue
|align=center|1993–94
|align=center|4th Transitional League
|align=center|16/18
|align=center|34
|align=center|9
|align=center|8
|align=center|17
|align=center|38
|align=center|51
|align=center|26
|align=center|
|align=center|
|align=center|
|align=center bgcolor=pink|Relegated
|- bgcolor=SteelBlue
|align=center|1994–95
|align=center|5th Amateur League Gr. 6
|align=center|4/17
|align=center|32
|align=center|21
|align=center|1
|align=center|10
|align=center|30
|align=center|21
|align=center|64
|align=center|
|align=center|
|align=center|
|align=center|
|-
|align=center colspan=14|...
|- bgcolor=SteelBlue
|align=center|2002
|align=center|5th Crimean Championship
|align=center|15/18
|align=center|34
|align=center|8
|align=center|6
|align=center|20
|align=center|36
|align=center|58
|align=center|30
|align=center|
|align=center|
|align=center|
|align=center|
|- bgcolor=SteelBlue
|align=center|2003
|align=center|5th Crimean Championship
|align=center|15/15
|align=center|28
|align=center|3
|align=center|1
|align=center|24
|align=center|12
|align=center|86
|align=center|10
|align=center|
|align=center|
|align=center|
|align=center|
|-
|align=center colspan=14|...
|- align=center bgcolor=SteelBlue
|align=center|2007
|align=center|5th Crimean Championship
|align=center|10/13
|align=center|24
|align=center|5
|align=center|3
|align=center|16
|align=center|25
|align=center|52
|align=center|18
|align=center|
|align=center|
|align=center|
|align=center|
|}

Crimea
{|class="wikitable"
|-bgcolor="#efefef"
! Season
! Div.
! Pos.
! Pl.
! W
! D
! L
! GS
! GA
! P
!Domestic Cup
!colspan=2|Europe
!Notes
|- align=center bgcolor=LightCyan
|align=center|2015–16
|align=center|2nd Open Championship
|align=center|14/16
|align=center|22
|align=center|1
|align=center|0
|align=center|21
|align=center|10
|align=center|86
|align=center|3
|align=center|
|align=center|
|align=center|
|align=center bgcolor=lightgrey|Withdrew, defunct
|}

Notable players
 Yuriy Mikhaylus

Honours
Crimea championship (Ukrainian Lower League Tier)
  1992, 1996/97

References

Defunct football clubs in Crimea
Sudak Municipality
Association football clubs disestablished in 2016
2016 disestablishments in Russia